Witold Szalonek (born in 1927 in Czechowice-Dziedzice, died in 2001 in Berlin) was a Polish composer.

In 1949-56 he studied at the State Higher School of Music in Katowice. Following his first successes at international composers' competitions, he received a grant from Kranichsteiner Musikinstitut in Darmstadt (1960). In 1962-63 he continued his studies with Nadia Boulanger in Paris. In 1967 he began to teach composition at the Katowice School and in 1970-74 was in charge of the Department of Composition and Theory. In the early 1970s he was invited by the Deutscher Akademischer Austauschdienst to work as artist in residence at West Berlin's Hochschule der Künste. In 1973 he won the competition to succeed Boris Blacher as Professor of Composition there. He has conducted numerous seminars and courses in composition in Poland, Denmark, Germany, Finland and Slovakia. In 1990 he received an honorary doctor's degree from the Wilhelmian University in Münster.

In 1963 Szalonek discovered and classified the so-called 'combined sounds' generated by the woodwind instruments. He is also the author of theoretical studies on a wide range of subjects, including combined sounds, sonorism, Chopin and Debussy.

Selected works
 Suite from Kurpie for Alto Solo and 9 Instruments, 1955
 Satire for Orchestra, 1956
 1+1+1+1 per 1-4 strumenti ad arco, 1969
 O, Pleasant Earth, Cantata for Voice and Orchestra, 1969
 Musica concertante for Double-bass and Orchestra, 1977
 Little Symphony B-A-C-H for Piano and Orchestra, 1981
 Bagattellae di Dahlem, II for Flute and Piano, 1998

References

External links 
 Witold Szalonek at Porta Polonica Documentation Centre in Germany
 Witold Szalonek at PWM Edition

1927 births
2001 deaths
20th-century classical composers
Polish composers
Polish male classical composers
20th-century male musicians